Rev is The Reverend Horton Heat's eleventh studio album, released with Victory Records on January 21, 2014. Peaking at number 111 on the Billboard 200 in the US, it is their highest charting record to date.

Track listing
All songs by James C. Heath except "Chasing Rainbows" by James C. Heath and James F. Wallace.
 "Victory Lap" – 3:23
 "Smell of Gasoline" – 4:16
 "Never Gonna Stop It" – 3:14
 "Zombie Dumb" – 3:52
 "Spooky Boots" – 4:41
 "Schizoid" – 3:06
 "Scenery Going By" – 4:37
 "My Hat" – 2:14
 "Let Me Teach You How To Eat" – 3:18
 "Mad Mad Heart" – 3:10
 "Longest Gonest Man" – 2:53
 "Hardscrabble Women" – 3:39
 "Chasing Rainbows" – 4:07

Personnel
Jim "Reverend Horton" Heath- Lead vocal, Guitar, Baritone guitar, Acoustic guitar, Background vocals, Recording engineer, record producer
Jim "Jimbo" Wallace – Upright bass, Background vocals
Scott Churilla – Drums, Percussion, Background vocals
Tim Alexander – Accordion on "Schizoid"
Hoss – Background vocals on "Hardscrabble Woman"

References

2014 albums
The Reverend Horton Heat albums
Victory Records albums